Orlane Kanor (born 16 June 1997) is a French handball player for  Rapid București and the French national team.

Achievements
French Championship:
Winner: 2016, 2017

Personal life
She has an identical twin sister named Laura Kanor who is a handballer for Metz Handball. She is also one of the handball players with best jumping skills.

References

External links

1997 births
Living people
French female handball players
Guadeloupean female handball players
People from Les Abymes
French people of Guadeloupean descent
Identical twins
Twin sportspeople
European champions for France
French twins